Yen Chiu-lai is a Taiwanese politician. He has served as the Deputy Minister of the Directorate-General of Personnel Administration of the Executive Yuan since 16 January 2013.

Education
Yen obtained his bachelor's degree in political science and master's degree in public administration from National Chengchi University in 1975 and 1981, respectively.

Directorate-General of Personnel Administration Deputy Ministry

Dispatched labor in Taiwan
Commenting on the widespread use of dispatched labor in Taiwan, which was alleged to cause wage stagnation, Yen said that the banning of such practice would be difficult because the needs to reduce personnel costs.

References

1953 births
Living people
Government ministers of Taiwan